Copelatus massaicus is a species of diving beetle. It is part of the genus Copelatus, which is in the subfamily Copelatinae of the family Dytiscidae. It was described by Félix Guignot in 1941.

References

massaicus
Beetles described in 1941